Yelena Borisovna Grishina (born 6 November 1968) is a Soviet fencer. She competed in the women's team foil events at the 1988 and 1992 Summer Olympics.

She is also a member of Match TV, the press attache of the Russian Fencing Federation.

Personal life
Yelena comes from a family of Olympians. Her father, Boris Grishin, medaled in the polo in the Olympics and her brother, Yevgeny Grishin, won bronze in polo in the Olympics as well. Her mother, Valentina Rastvorova, was a six-time world champion foil fencer who ascended the Olympic podium twice. Her son, Sergey Bida, is a top ranked epee fencer who is poised to make his Olympic debut in Tokyo.

References

External links
 
 Профиль на сайте Федерации фехтования России

1968 births
Living people
Russian female foil fencers
Soviet female foil fencers
Olympic fencers of the Soviet Union
Olympic fencers of the Unified Team
Fencers at the 1988 Summer Olympics
Fencers at the 1992 Summer Olympics
Sports commentators
Russian people of Ukrainian descent